Ratu Bumi Malaysia is an annual national beauty pageant that selects Malaysia's representative to the Miss Earth pageant. On occasion, when the winner does not qualify (due to age) for either contest, a runner-up is sent. 

The reigning titleholder is Manvin Khera from Kuala Lumpur. She will represent Malaysia at Miss Earth 2023.

History 
Miss Earth Malaysia is one of the beauty pageant in Malaysia that has the focus on educating and empowering others about the knowledge of natural beauty, sustainability and eco-tourism. The pageant serves as a platform to educate the contestants about the environmental issues, promote eco-tourism and create a healthy aspect of cordial relationship among its participants. The pageant's title was known as "Miss Earth Malaysia" from 2001 until 2018 and 2021, also Women of Malaysia in 2019.

In 2019, Miss Earth Malaysia organization decided to no longer conduct the bikini segment during the national competition as it could give equal chances and opportunities for Muslim women in Malaysia to participate in the pageant for the first time. Still there will be a swimsuit round in the Miss Earth pageant. In 2020, the previous national director, Mr. Abdul Nazri Abdullah dropped the franchise of Miss Earth Malaysia. Malaysia was also once did not compete in Miss Earth 2020.

In 2020, the Miss Earth Malaysia organization was modernized and changed its name to Ratu Bumi Malaysia, and moved its headquarters from Ipoh, Perak to Klang, Selangor. The pageant is now fully organized by the Tiara Management team with license holder Double Event Management since March 2020.

Competition 
The winner of the pageant is bestowed the title Miss Earth Malaysia and get to represent Malaysia in the international stage. Runners-up are given the titles named after the other natural elements namely:

 Miss Malaysia Air (first runner-up),
 Miss Malaysia Water (second runner-up),
 Miss Malaysia Fire (equivalent to third runner-up), and
 Miss Eco-Tourism
 Miss Eco-Beauty

Editions 
2007 nilai convention hall

2008 Everly Resort Poolside

Titleholders

2022–present

2005–2019

Malaysia representatives at Miss Earth

Winners by state

Locations 
The pageant has been staged in numerous locations since 2001, with some location lasted four to six years.

The pageant has been held in the following states as of 2020:

Perak
Ipoh (2001–2003, 2010–2017)
Penang
Bayan Lepas (2004–2005)
George Town (2006)
Selangor
Tanjung Sepat (2007)

Malacca
Malacca City (2008–2009)
Sarawak
Kuching (2018)
Sabah
Kota Kinabalu (2019)
Kuala Lumpur
Quill City (2021)
Campbell Complex (2022)

Trivia

National Directors 

 Leong Hoong Kit (2010–2017)
 Star Avenue Production (2018)
 Abdul Nazri Abdullah (2019)
 Tiara Management (2020–present)

Franchise Holders 

 Exclusive Resources Marketing Malaysia Ltd. Ptd. (2010–2015)
 Blue Planet International (2016–2017)
 Manoy Handicraft (2018)
Double Event Management (2020–present)

Name Changes 

 Miss Malaysia Earth (2001–2017)
 Miss Earth Malaysia (2018, 2021–present)
 Women of Malaysia (2019)
Ratu Bumi Malaysia (2022)

Notes

See also 
 Miss Earth

References

External links 

 Official website

Beauty pageants in Malaysia
Miss Earth by country